The Huron Islands are a group of eight small, rocky islands in Lake Superior, located about  off the mouth of the Huron River in northwestern Marquette County, Michigan, United States. Together they comprise the Huron National Wildlife Refuge, which was established by President Theodore Roosevelt in 1905. The refuge is also known as the Huron Islands Wilderness and is a unit of the Seney National Wildlife Refuge.  The underwater area around the islands is part of the Huron Islands unit of the Marquette Underwater Preserve and several shipwrecks can be visited by divers.

Only one of the islands, known as Lighthouse Island or West Huron Island, is open to the public, and is accessible only by private boat for day use. This island is the site of the historic Huron Island Light, built in 1868. The lighthouse still operates, but is now fully automated.

There is a walking path from the boat landing site on the south end of the island to the lighthouse. The path continues beyond the lighthouse to the structures and cliffs on the far north end of the island. The path from the lighthouse to the north end of the island is quite rustic and is often overgrown with brush.

The larger islands are sparsely forested with pine and birch. The smaller islands are bare granite outcroppings, and home to a large colony of herring gulls. Bald eagles also nest here.

References

External links
 Huron National Wildlife Refuge
 Huron Island Light Station at Seeing the Light
 Huron Island Light at NPS Inventory of Historic Light Stations
 Huron Islands Wilderness 

Protected areas of Marquette County, Michigan
National Wildlife Refuges in Michigan
Wilderness areas of Michigan
Uninhabited islands of Michigan
Islands of Lake Superior in Michigan
Protected areas established in 1905
1905 establishments in Michigan
Islands of Marquette County, Michigan